Lepista is a genus of mushroom-forming fungi. According to the Dictionary of the Fungi (10th edition, 2008), the widespread genus contains about 50 species. In 1969, Howard Bigelow and Alex H. Smith made the group a subgenus of Clitocybe.

A 2015 genetic study found that the genera Collybia and Lepista were closely related to the core clade of Clitocybe, but that all three were polyphyletic, with many members in lineages removed from other members of the same genus and instead more closely related to the other two. Alvarado and colleagues declined to define the genera but proposed several options and highlighted the need for a wider analysis.

Selected species
 Lepista caespitosa
 Lepista glaucocana
 Lepista personata
 Lepista saeva (field blewit)
 Lepista sordida

See also
List of Tricholomataceae genera

References

Further reading
Gulden, G. (1983). "Studies in Lepista (Fr.) W.G. Smith section Lepista (Basidiomycotina, Agaricales)".  Sydowia. 36: 59–74.
Gulden, G. (1992). "Lepista". In Hansen, L. & Knudsen, H. (red.): Nordic macromycetes, vol 2. - Copenhagen
Harmaja, H. (1974). "A revision of the generic limit between Clitocybe and Lepista". Karstenia. 14: 82–92.
Harmaja, H. (1976). "A further revision of the generic limit between Lepista and Clitocybe". Karstenia. 15: 13–15.
Harmaja, H. (2003). "Notes on Clitocybe s. lato (Agaricales)". Annales Botanici Fennici. 40: 213–218.
Lange, J. E. (1935). Flora Agaricina Danica. bind 1. Copenhagen.

Moser, M. (1983). "Die Röhrlinge und Blätterpilze". Kleine Kryptogamenflora. 5. Auflage. Stuttgart.
Petersen, J. H. & Vesterholt, J. (1990) (red.). Danske storsvampe. Copenhagen.
Reid, A. D. (1968). "Coloured icones of rare and interesting fungi", part 3. Suppl. Nova Hedwigia. 15: 13–14.

 
Agaricales genera